Alma (Rivière La Grande Décharge) Water Aerodrome  is located  northeast of Alma, Quebec, Canada and is open from the middle of April to the middle of November.

See also
 Alma Airport
 CFB Bagotville

References

Alma, Quebec
Registered aerodromes in Saguenay–Lac-Saint-Jean
Seaplane bases in Quebec